South Pacific Manufacturing Co Ltd v New Zealand Security Consultants & Investigations Ltd [1992] 2 NZLR 282  is a cited case in New Zealand regarding duty of care in negligence

References

Court of Appeal of New Zealand cases
New Zealand tort case law
1992 in case law
1992 in New Zealand law